Montmirail is a commune in the Marne department in north-eastern France.

Jean François Paul de Gondi, cardinal de Retz (1613-1679), a French churchman, writer of memoirs, and agitator in the Fronde was born in Montmirail.

Population

See also
Communes of the Marne department

References

Communes of Marne (department)